Charles Cotesworth Beaman Sr. (May 7, 1840 – December 15, 1900) was an American lawyer who wrote The National and Private Alabama Claims and their Final and Amicable Settlement (1871). In December 1870 he served as the first-ever Solicitor General of the United States, a position created to compile the individual claims of losses caused by Confederate raider ships during the United States Civil War.

Biography
Charles Cotesworth Beaman was born in Houlton, Maine on May 7, 1840.

He graduated from Harvard University and Harvard Law School. He began practicing law in New York City in 1867.

Beaman was also a vice president of the University Club of New York from 1890 to 1899 and a president from 1899 to 1900.

He died at his home in New York on December 15, 1900.

References

External links

Saint-Gaudens National Historical Site
Charles C. Beaman
William Evarts & Hettie Evarts Beaman
William Maxwell Evarts Bust
Saint-Gaudens' General William T. Sherman
 

Lawyers who have represented the United States government
New York (state) lawyers
1840 births
1900 deaths
Harvard Law School alumni
19th-century American lawyers